Sathyabhama is a 2007 Indian Telugu-language drama film directed by Srihari Nanu. The film stars Sivaji and Bhumika Chawla. The film is based on the 2004 American film 50 First Dates. The film won two Nandi Awards.

Plot
The film follows a sand sculptor (Sivaji) who meets a woman (Bhumika Chawla) with memory loss.

Cast

 Sivaji as Krishna
 Bhumika Chawla as Sathyabhama
 Nimisha
 Chandra Mohan
 Krishna as the psychiatrist (special appearance)
 Brahmanandam 
 Sunil
 M. S. Narayana as Padi Secondla Padmanabham
 Raghu Babu 
 Siva Prasad 
 Melkote
 Devi Charan
 Chitram Seenu 
 Allari Subhashini as the restaurant manager
 Babloo 
 Apoorva
 Master Siva Varma
 Baby Satyapriya

Production 
Sivaji's character was inspired by Sudarshan Patnaik. The film was shot in Goa.

Soundtrack 
The music is composed by Chakri.

Release
Sify praised the performance of the cast and opined that "On the whole, this film will only appeal to family audiences". Idlebrain said that "It disappoints the people who already watched 50 First Dates. But it may offer some variety for those people who have not watched 50 First Dates yet". Full Hyderabad gave a negative review and stated "Take it easy with this one unless you can forget tomorrow what you did today".

Awards 
Nandi Awards
 Special Jury Award for Best Performance - Bhumika Chawla
 Best Female Playback Singer - Kousalya

References

External links

2007 films
2000s Telugu-language films
Films scored by Chakri